

2016 Summer Olympics (BWF)
 August 11–20: 2016 Summer Olympics in  Rio de Janeiro at the Riocentro
 Men's Singles:   Chen Long;   Lee Chong Wei;   Viktor Axelsen
 Women's Singles:   Carolina Marín;   P. V. Sindhu;   Nozomi Okuhara
 Men's Doubles:
   (Fu Haifeng & Zhang Nan)
   (Goh V Shem & Tan Wee Kiong)
   (Chris Langridge & Marcus Ellis)
 Women's Doubles:
   (Misaki Matsutomo & Ayaka Takahashi)
   (Christinna Pedersen & Kamilla Rytter Juhl)
   (Jung Kyung-eun & Shin Seung-chan)
 Mixed Doubles:
   (Tontowi Ahmad & Liliyana Natsir)
   (Chan Peng Soon & Goh Liu Ying)
   (Zhang Nan & Zhao Yunlei)

International badminton championships
 February 15–21: 2016 Africa Continental Team Championships in  Beau-Bassin Rose-Hill
 February 15 – 21: 2016 Badminton Asia Team Championships in  Hyderabad
 February 16 – 18: 2016 Oceania Continental Mixed Team Championships in  North Harbour, New Zealand (Auckland)
 February 16 – 21: 2016 European Men's & Women's Team Championships in  Kazan
 February 17 – 20: 2016 Pan Am Team Continental Championships in  Guadalajara
 Men:  defeated , 3–0, in the final.
 Women:  defeated , 3–2, in the final.
 February 19 & 20: 2016 Oceania Continental Men's and Women's Team Championships in  Auckland
 February 19 – 21: 2016 European U15 Championships in  Kazan
 Men's Singles:  Harry Huang
 Men's Doubles:  Kenji Lovang / Christo Popov
 Women's Singles:  Mathilde Cramer Ahrens
 Women's Doubles:  Bengisu Erçetin / Zehra Erdem
 Mixed Doubles:  Sebastian Grønbjerg / Clara Graversen
 March 17 – 21: 2016 European U17 Team Championships in  Lubin
 March 21 – 25: 2016 European U17 Championships in  Lubin
 Men's Singles:  Nhat Nguyen
 Men's Doubles:  Paw Eriksen / Mads Thøgersen
 Women's Singles:  Line Christopher
 Women's Doubles:  Alexandra Boje / Amalie Mage Krogh
 Mixed Doubles:  Paw Eriksen / Alexandra Boje
 April 25 – 27: 2016 Pan American Team Badminton Championships in  Campinas
  defeated , 3–2 in matches played, in the final.  took third place.
 April 26 – 28: 2016 Oceania Individual Championships in  Papeete
 Men's Singles:  Ashwant Gobinathan 
 Men's Doubles:  Matthew Chau / Sawan Serasinghe
 Women's Singles:  Wendy Hsuan-Yu Chen
 Women's Doubles:  Tiffany Ho / Jennifer Tam
 Mixed Doubles:  Robin Middleton / Leanne Choo
 April 26 – May 1: 2016 European Badminton Championships in  La Roche-sur-Yon
 Men's Singles:  Viktor Axelsen
 Men's Doubles:  Mads Conrad-Petersen / Mads Pieler Kolding
 Women's Singles:  Carolina Marín
 Women's Doubles:  Christinna Pedersen / Kamilla Rytter Juhl
 Mixed Doubles:  Joachim Fischer Nielsen / Christinna Pedersen
 April 26 – May 1: 2016 Badminton Asia Championships in  Wuhan
 Men's Singles:  Lee Chong Wei
 Men's Doubles:  Lee Yong-dae / Yoo Yeon-seong
 Women's Singles:  Wang Yihan
 Women's Doubles:  Misaki Matsutomo / Ayaka Takahashi
 Mixed Doubles:  Zhang Nan / Zhao Yunlei
 April 28 – May 1: 2016 Pan American Individual Championships in  Campinas
 Men's Singles:  Jason Anthony Ho-Shue
 Men's Doubles:  Jason Anthony Ho-Shue / Nyl Yakura
 Women's Singles:  Brittney Tam
 Women's Doubles:  Michelle Tong / Josephine Wu
 Mixed Doubles:  Nyl Yakura / Brittney Tam
 May 15 – 22: 2016 Thomas & Uber Cup in  Kunshan
 Thomas Cup:  defeated , 3–2 in matches played, to win their first Thomas Cup title.
 Uber Cup:  defeated , 3–1 in matches played, to win their third consecutive and 14th overall Uber Cup title. 
 July 9 – 17: 2016 Badminton Asia Junior Championships in  Bangkok
 Mixed Team: 
 Boys' Singles:  Sun Feixiang
 Girls' Singles:  Chen Yufei
 Boys' Doubles:  Han Chengkai / Zhou Haodong
 Girls' Doubles:  Du Yue / Xu Ya
 Mixed Doubles:  He Jiting / Du Yue
 July 19 – 23: 2016 Pan American U19 Championships in  Lima
 Boys' Singles:  Cleyson Nob Santos
 Girls' Singles:  OUYANG Qingzi
 Boys' Doubles:  Desmond Wang / Brian Yang
 Girls' Doubles:  Giselle Chan / Katie Ho-Shue
 Mixed Doubles:  Brian Yang / Katie Ho-Shue
 September 12 – 18: 2016 World University Badminton Championship in  Ramenskoye
 Men's Singles:  WANG Tzu Wei
 Men's Doubles:  Choi Sol-gyu / Kim Jae-hwan
 Women's Singles:  Ayaho Sugino
 Women's Doubles:  DU Peng / Huang Dongping
 Mixed Doubles:  LEE Yang / HSU Ya-Ching
 Team winners:  
 November 2 – 6: 2016 World Junior Mixed Team Championships in  Bilbao
 1. ; 2. ; 3/4:  / 
 November 8 – 13: 2016 BWF World Junior Championships in  Bilbao
 Boys' Singles:  Sun Feixiang
 Girls' Singles:  Chen Yufei
 Boys' Doubles:  Han Chengkai / Zhou Haodong
 Girls' Doubles:  Sayaka Hobara / Nami Matsuyama
 Mixed Doubles:  He Jiting / Du Yue

2016 BWF Super Series
 March 8 – December 18: 2016 BWF Super Series Calendar of Events
 March 8–13: 2016 All England Super Series Premier in  Birmingham
 Men's Singles:  Lin Dan
 Men's Doubles:  Vladimir Ivanov / Ivan Sozonov
 Women's Singles:  Nozomi Okuhara
 Women's Doubles:  Misaki Matsutomo / Ayaka Takahashi
 Mixed Doubles:  Praveen Jordan / Debby Susanto
 March 29 – April 3: 2016 India Super Series in  New Delhi
 Men's Singles:  Kento Momota
 Men's Doubles:  Markus Fernaldi Gideon / Kevin Sanjaya Sukamuljo
 Women's Singles:  Ratchanok Intanon
 Women's Doubles:  Misaki Matsutomo / Ayaka Takahashi
 Mixed Doubles:  Lu Kai / Huang Yaqiong
 April 5–10: 2016 Malaysia Super Series Premier in  Shah Alam
 Men's Singles:  Lee Chong Wei
 Men's Doubles:  Kim Gi-jung / Kim Sa-rang
 Women's Singles:  Ratchanok Intanon
 Women's Doubles:  Tang Yuanting / Yu Yang
 Mixed Doubles:  Tontowi Ahmad / Liliyana Natsir
 April 12–17: 2016 Singapore Super Series in 
 Men's Singles:  Sony Dwi Kuncoro
 Men's Doubles:  Fu Haifeng / Zhang Nan
 Women's Singles:  Ratchanok Intanon
 Women's Doubles:  Nitya Krishinda Maheswari / Greysia Polii
 Mixed Doubles:  Ko Sung-hyun / Kim Ha-na
 May 30 – June 5: 2016 Indonesia Super Series Premier in  Jakarta
 Men's Singles:  Lee Chong Wei
 Men's Doubles:  Lee Yong-dae / Yoo Yeon-seong
 Women's Singles:  Tai Tzu-ying
 Women's Doubles:  Misaki Matsutomo / Ayaka Takahashi
 Mixed Doubles:  Xu Chen / Ma Jin
 June 7–12: 2016 Australian Super Series in  Sydney
 Men's Singles:  Hans-Kristian Vittinghus
 Men's Doubles:  Markus Fernaldi Gideon / Kevin Sanjaya Sukamuljo
 Women's Singles:  Saina Nehwal
 Women's Doubles:  Bao Yixin / Chen Qingchen
 Mixed Doubles:  Lu Kai / Huang Yaqiong
 September 20–25: 2016 Japan Super Series in  Tokyo
 Men's Singles:  Lee Chong Wei
 Men's Doubles:  Li Junhui / Liu Yuchen
 Women's Singles:  He Bingjiao
 Women's Doubles:  Christinna Pedersen / Kamilla Rytter Juhl
 Mixed Doubles:  Zheng Siwei / Chen Qingchen
 September 27 – October 2: 2016 Korea Open Super Series in  Seoul
 Men's Singles:  Qiao Bin
 Men's Doubles:  Lee Yong-dae / Yoo Yeon-seong
 Women's Singles:  Akane Yamaguchi
 Women's Doubles:  Jung Kyung-eun / Shin Seung-chan
 Mixed Doubles:  Ko Sung-hyun / Kim Ha-na
 October 18–23: 2016 Denmark Super Series Premier in  Odense
 Men's Singles:  Tanongsak Saensomboonsuk
 Men's Doubles:  Goh V Shem / Tan Wee Kiong
 Women's Singles:  Akane Yamaguchi
 Women's Doubles:  Misaki Matsutomo / Ayaka Takahashi
 Mixed Doubles:  Joachim Fischer Nielsen / Christinna Pedersen
 October 25–30: 2016 French Super Series in  Paris
 Men's Singles:  Shi Yuqi
 Men's Doubles:  Mathias Boe / Carsten Mogensen
 Women's Singles:  He Bingjiao
 Women's Doubles:  Chen Qingchen / Jia Yifan
 Mixed Doubles:  Zheng Siwei / Chen Qingchen
 November 15–20: 2016 China Open Super Series Premier in  Fuzhou
 Men's Singles:  Jan Ø. Jørgensen
 Men's Doubles:  Marcus Fernaldi Gideon / Kevin Sanjaya Sukamuljo
 Women's Singles:  P. V. Sindhu
 Women's Doubles:  Chang Ye-na / Lee So-hee
 Mixed Doubles:  Tontowi Ahmad / Liliyana Natsir
 November 22–27: 2016 Hong Kong Super Series in  Kowloon
 Men's Singles:  Angus Ng
 Men's Doubles:  Takeshi Kamura / Keigo Sonoda
 Women's Singles:  Tai Tzu-ying
 Women's Doubles:  Kamilla Rytter Juhl / Christinna Pedersen
 Mixed Doubles:  Tontowi Ahmad / Liliyana Natsir
 December 14–18: 2016 BWF Super Series Masters Finals in  Dubai
 Men's Singles:  Viktor Axelsen
 Men's Doubles:  Goh V Shem / Tan Wee Kiong
 Women's Singles:  Tai Tzu-ying
 Women's Doubles:  Chen Qingchen / Jia Yifan
 Mixed Doubles:  Zheng Siwei / Chen Qingchen

2016 BWF Grand Prix Gold and Grand Prix
 January 19 – December 11: 2016 BWF Grand Prix Gold and Grand Prix Calendar of Events
 January 19–24: 2016 Malaysia Masters Grand Prix Gold in  Penang
 Men's Singles:  Lee Chong Wei
 Men's Doubles:  Markus Fernaldi Gideon / Kevin Sanjaya Sukamuljo
 Women's Singles:  P. V. Sindhu
 Women's Doubles:  Misaki Matsutomo / Ayaka Takahashi
 Mixed Doubles:  Zheng Siwei / Li Yinhui
 January 26–31: 2016 Syed Modi International Grand Prix Gold in  Lucknow
 Men's Singles:  Srikanth Kidambi
 Men's Doubles:  Goh V Shem / Tan Wee Kiong
 Women's Singles:  Sung Ji-hyun
 Women's Doubles:  Jung Kyung-eun / Shin Seung-chan
 Mixed Doubles:  Praveen Jordan / Debby Susanto
 February 8–13: 2016 Thailand Masters Grand Prix Gold in  Bangkok
 Men's Singles:  Lee Hyun-il
 Men's Doubles:  Mohammad Ahsan / Hendra Setiawan
 Women's Singles:  Ratchanok Intanon
 Women's Doubles:  Tian Qing / Zhao Yunlei
 Mixed Doubles:  Zheng Siwei / Chen Qingchen
 March 1–6: 2016 German Open Grand Prix Gold in  Mülheim
 Men's Singles:  Lin Dan
 Men's Doubles:  Ko Sung-hyun / Shin Baek-cheol
 Women's Singles:  Li Xuerui
 Women's Doubles:  Huang Yaqiong / Tang Jinhua
 Mixed Doubles:  Ko Sung-hyun / Kim Ha-na
 March 15–20: 2016 Swiss Open Grand Prix Gold in  Basel
 Men's Singles:  Prannoy Kumar
 Men's Doubles:  Kim Astrup / Anders Skaarup Rasmussen
 Women's Singles:  He Bingjiao
 Women's Doubles:  Shizuka Matsuo / Mami Naito
 Mixed Doubles:  Wang Yilu / Chen Qingchen
 March 22–27: 2016 New Zealand Open Grand Prix in  Auckland
 Men's Singles:  Huang Yuxiang
 Men's Doubles:  Ko Sung-hyun / Shin Baek-cheol
 Women's Singles:  Sung Ji-hyun
 Women's Doubles:  Yuki Fukushima / Sayaka Hirota
 Mixed Doubles:  Chan Peng Soon / Goh Liu Ying
 April 19–24: 2016 China Masters Grand Prix Gold in  Changzhou (Jiangsu)
 Men's Singles:  Lin Dan
 Men's Doubles:  Lee Yong-dae / Yoo Yeon-seong
 Women's Singles:  Li Xuerui
 Women's Doubles:  Luo Ying / Luo Yu
 Mixed Doubles:  Xu Chen / Ma Jin
 June 28 – July 3: 2016 Chinese Taipei Open Grand Prix Gold in  Taipei
 Men's Singles:  Chou Tien-chen
 Men's Doubles:  Li Junhui / Liu Yuchen
 Women's Singles:  Tai Tzu-ying
 Women's Doubles:  Huang Dongping / Zhong Qianxin
 Mixed Doubles:  Zheng Siwei / Chen Qingchen
 June 28 – July 3: 2016 Canada Open Grand Prix in  Calgary
 Men's Singles:  B. Sai Praneeth
 Men's Doubles:  Manu Attri / B. Sumeeth Reddy
 Women's Singles:  Michelle Li
 Women's Doubles:  Setyana Mapasa / Gronya Somerville
 Mixed Doubles:  Do Tuan Duc / Pham Nhu Thao
 July 18–24: 2016 Vietnam Open Grand Prix in  Ho Chi Minh City
 Men's Singles:  Wong Wing Ki
 Men's Doubles:  Lee Jhe-huei / Lee Yang
 Women's Singles:  Yeo Jia Min
 Women's Doubles:  Della Destiara Haris / Rosyita Eka Putri Sari
 Mixed Doubles:  Tan Kian Meng / Lai Pei Jing
 August 30 – September 4: 2016 Brazil Open Grand Prix in  Foz do Iguaçu
 Men's Singles:  Zulfadli Zulkiffli
 Men's Doubles:  Michael Fuchs / Fabian Holzer
 Women's Singles:  Beatriz Corrales
 Women's Doubles:  Barbara Bellenberg / Eva Janssens
 Mixed Doubles:  Pranaav Jerry Chopra / N. Sikki Reddy
 September 6–11: 2016 Indonesian Masters Grand Prix Gold in  Balikpapan
 Men's Singles:  Shi Yuqi
 Men's Doubles:  Wahyu Nayaka / Kevin Sanjaya Sukamuljo
 Women's Singles:  Busanan Ongbamrungphan
 Women's Doubles:  Chae Yoo-jung / Kim So-yeong
 Mixed Doubles:  Ronald Alexander / Melati Daeva Oktavianti
 October 4–9: 2016 Thailand Open Grand Prix Gold in  Bangkok
 Men's Singles:  Tanongsak Saensomboonsuk
 Men's Doubles:  Berry Angriawan / Rian Agung Saputro
 Women's Singles:  Aya Ohori
 Women's Doubles:  Puttita Supajirakul / Sapsiree Taerattanachai
 Mixed Doubles:  Tan Kian Meng / Lai Pei Jing
 October 4–9: 2016 Russia Open Grand Prix in  Vladivostok
 Men's Singles:  Zulfadli Zulkiffli
 Men's Doubles:  Vladimir Ivanov / Ivan Sozonov
 Women's Singles:  Gadde Ruthvika Shivani
 Women's Doubles:  Anastasia Chervyakova / Olga Morozova
 Mixed Doubles:  Pranaav Jerry Chopra / N. Sikki Reddy
 October 11–16: 2016 Chinese Taipei Masters in  Taipei
 Men's Singles:  Sourabh Varma
 Men's Doubles:  Fajar Alfian / Muhammad Rian Ardianto
 Women's Singles:  Ayumi Mine
 Women's Doubles:  Yuki Fukushima / Sayaka Hirota
 Mixed Doubles:  Tang Chun Man / Tse Ying Suet
 October 11–16: 2016 Dutch Open Grand Prix in  Almere
 Men's Singles:  Wang Tzu-wei
 Men's Doubles:  Lee Jhe-huei / Lee Yang
 Women's Singles:  Zhang Beiwen
 Women's Doubles:  Setyana Mapasa / Gronya Somerville
 Mixed Doubles:  Mathias Christiansen / Sara Thygesen
 November 1–6: 2016 Bitburger Open Grand Prix Gold in  Saarbrücken
 Men's Singles:  Shi Yuqi
 Men's Doubles:  Ong Yew Sin / Teo Ee Yi
 Women's Singles:  He Bingjiao
 Women's Doubles:  Chen Qingchen / Jia Yifan
 Mixed Doubles:  Zheng Siwei / Chen Qingchen
 November 23–27: 2016 Scottish Open Grand Prix in  Glasgow
 Men's Singles:  Soong Joo Ven
 Men's Doubles:  Mathias Christiansen / David Daugaard
 Women's Singles:  Mette Poulsen
 Women's Doubles:  Amelia Alicia Anscelly / Teoh Mei Xing
 Mixed Doubles:  Goh Soon Huat / Shevon Jemie Lai
 November 29 – December 4: 2016 Macau Open Grand Prix Gold in 
 Men's Singles:  Zhao Junpeng
 Men's Doubles:  Lee Jhe-huei / Lee Yang
 Women's Singles:  Chen Yufei
 Women's Doubles:  Chen Qingchen / Jia Yifan
 Mixed Doubles:  Zhang Nan / Li Yinhui
 December 6–11: 2016 Korea Masters Grand Prix Gold (final) in  Jeonju
 Men's Singles:  Son Wan-ho
 Men's Doubles:  Kim Jae-hwan / Ko Sung-hyun
 Women's Singles:  Sung Ji-hyun
 Women's Doubles:  Jung Kyung-eun / Shin Seung-chan
 Mixed Doubles:  Ko Sung-hyun / Kim Ha-na

References

 
Badminton by year